The following lists events that happened during 1976 in New Zealand.

Population
 Estimated population as of 31 December: 3,163,400
 Increase since 31 December 1975: 19,700 (0.63%)
 Males per 100 females: 99.5

Incumbents

Regal and viceregal
Head of State – Elizabeth II
Governor-General – Sir Denis Blundell GCMG GCVO KBE QSO.

Government
Speaker of the House – Roy Jack.
Prime Minister – Robert Muldoon
Deputy Prime Minister – Brian Talboys.
Minister of Finance – Robert Muldoon.
Minister of Foreign Affairs – Brian Talboys.
Attorney-General – Peter Wilkinson.
Chief Justice — Sir Richard Wild

Parliamentary opposition
 Leader of the Opposition –  Bill Rowling (Labour).

Main centre leaders
Mayor of Auckland – Dove-Myer Robinson
Mayor of Hamilton – Mike Minogue then Bruce Beetham
Mayor of Wellington – Michael Fowler
Mayor of Christchurch – Hamish Hay
Mayor of Dunedin – Jim Barnes

Events
28 February – Nelson by-election – Mel Courtney (Labour) elected to replace the late Stan Whitehead.
1 April – The New Zealand Fire Service is formed, following the nationwide merger of urban fire boards and fire brigades brought about by the Fire Service Act 1975.
7 June – The nation's first McDonald's restaurant opens in central Porirua.
17 July – 1 August – New Zealand competes at the 1976 Summer Olympics in Montreal, Quebec, Canada, despite 28 African nations boycotting the games over New Zealand's sporting ties with apartheid South Africa. The nation wins four medals: two gold, one silver and one bronze.
15 September – The Union Company's Lyttelton to Wellington ferry service is cancelled, having operated since 1895 and by the Ministry of Transport since 1974, facing increased competition from air travel and the Railways' Cook Strait ferry service.
1 November – The Waitangi Day Act 1976 commences, replacing the New Zealand Day public holiday with Waitangi Day on 6 February.
14 December – The Weights and Measures Amendment Act commences, officially completing metrication in New Zealand.

Arts and literature
Sam Hunt wins the Robert Burns Fellowship.

See 1976 in art, 1976 in literature

Music

New Zealand Music Awards
ALBUM OF THE YEAR  NZSO – Symphony No. 2
RECORDING ARTIST/GROUP OF THE YEAR  Dr Tree
BEST NEW ARTIST Dr Tree
PRODUCER OF THE YEAR Alan Galbraith  – Taking It All in Stride
ENGINEER OF THE YEAR  Peter Hitchcock – Taking It All in Stride
ARRANGER OF THE YEAR  David Frazer – Taking It All in Stride
COMPOSER OF THE YEAR  John Hanlon  – Night Life

See: 1976 in music

Performing arts

 Benny Award presented by the Variety Artists Club of New Zealand to Merv Smith and Rusty Greaves.

Radio and television
Television Two is renamed South Pacific Television.
All broadcasting services, including radio, are merged into the Broadcasting Corporation of New Zealand.  
17–18 July: A power failure affecting the Blue Duck microwave station near Kaikoura causes both the TV One  and TV Two networks to split into two. Most of the South Island misses the live opening ceremony of the 1976 Summer Olympics as a result.
Feltex Television Awards:
Best Programme: Pearse
Best Personality: John Clarke and Dougal Stevenson
Actor: Martyn Sanderson
Actress: Ilona Rodgers
Best Series: One Man's View
Best Script: Ian Mune and Peter Hansard: Winners And Losers: The Woman at the Store

See: 1976 in New Zealand television, 1976 in television, List of TVNZ television programming, :Category:Television in New Zealand, :Category:New Zealand television shows, Public broadcasting in New Zealand

Film
The God Boy

See: :Category:1976 film awards, 1976 in film, List of New Zealand feature films, Cinema of New Zealand, :Category:1976 films

Sport

Athletics
 UK-born Jack Foster wins his first national title in the men's marathon, clocking 2:16:27 on 6 March in Auckland.

Chess
 The 83rd National Chess Championship is held in Upper Hutt. There is a three-way tie for the title between Lev Aptekar, Murray Chandler, and Ortvin Sarapu .

Horse racing

Harness racing
 New Zealand Trotting Cup: Stanley Rio
 Auckland Trotting Cup: Bolton Byrd

Olympic Games

Summer Olympics

 New Zealand sends a team of 80 competitors.

Winter Olympics

 New Zealand sends a team of five alpine skiers.

Paralympic Games

Summer Paralympics

 New Zealand sends a team of 12 competitors.

Soccer
 New Zealand National Soccer League won by Wellington Diamond United
 The Chatham Cup is won by Christchurch United who beat Eastern Suburbs (Auckland) 4–0 in the final.

Births
 1 January – Karl Burnett, actor
 13 January – Bic Runga, singer, songwriter
 12 February – Christian Cullen, rugby union footballer
 14 March – Sarah Ulmer, cyclist
 31 March – Anna Rowberry, netball player
 6 April – Bruce Reihana, rugby player
 10 April – Jason Richards, motor racing driver (d. 2011)
 7 May – Stacey Jones, rugby league footballer
 14 May – Jason Reeves, broadcaster
 3 June – Miriama Smith, actress
 7 July – Ron Cribb, rugby union footballer
 3 August – Rachel Sutherland, field hockey player
 3 September – Ivan Vicelich, soccer player
 13 September – Craig McMillan, cricketer
 3 October – Simon Wills, motor racing driver
 4 November – Troy Flavell, rugby union footballer
 20 November – Doug Viney, K-1 fighter
 3 December – Byron Kelleher, rugby union footballer
 13 December – Mark Paston, soccer player
 15 December – Joseph Yovich, cricketer
 21 December – Mark Dickel, basketball player
:Category:1976 births

Deaths
 9 January: Sir Stanley Whitehead, politician and 15th Speaker of the House of Representatives.
 7 February (in Australia): Sir Cedric Stanton Hicks, nutrition scientist.
 12 June: Herb Lilburne, All Black captain.
 20 July: Tom Lowry, cricketer.
 19 August: Ken Wadsworth, cricketer.
 21 August: Ken James, cricketer.
 12 November: Cliff Porter, All Black captain.
 14 November: Ernest Toop, politician, deputy mayor of Wellington

See also
List of years in New Zealand
Timeline of New Zealand history
History of New Zealand
Military history of New Zealand
Timeline of the New Zealand environment
Timeline of New Zealand's links with Antarctica

References

External links

 
New Zealand
Years of the 20th century in New Zealand